Mary Bebe Anderson (April 3, 1918 – April 6, 2014) was an American actress, who appeared in 31 films and 22 television productions between 1939 and 1965. She was best known for her small supporting role in the film Gone With the Wind as well as one of the main characters in Alfred Hitchcock's 1944 film Lifeboat.

Early life
Anderson's younger brother James Anderson (1921–1969) was also an actor, best known as Bob Ewell in To Kill a Mockingbird (1962). They appeared in one film together, 1951's Hunt the Man Down.

Career

After two uncredited roles, she made her first important screen appearance in Gone With the Wind (1939). After auditioning as one of the 1,400 actresses involved in the search for Scarlett, she received the supporting role of Maybelle Merriwether.
 

In 1944, she played Alice the nurse, one of the ten characters in the Alfred Hitchcock film Lifeboat. Ending her film career in the early 1950s, she occasionally acted on television, for example as Catherine Harrington on Peyton Place in 1964 (episodes 2-20). She made a guest appearance in Perry Mason as Arlene Scott in "The Case of the Rolling Bones" (1958).

Personal life
Anderson died on April 6, 2014, in Burbank, California, of a stroke, three days after her 96th birthday. She was under hospice care and died in a condo in Toluca Lake that she shared with her long-time companion, Gordon Carnon.

Partial filmography

References

External links

 

1918 births
2014 deaths
American television actresses
American film actresses
Actresses from Birmingham, Alabama
Samford University alumni
20th-century American actresses
Burials at Forest Lawn Memorial Park (Hollywood Hills)